Mougambi is a small village on an island located on the Ndogo Lagoon in Gabon, between the town of Gamba and the village Setté Cama. The closest village to Mougambi is Pitonga.

Populated places in Ngounié Province
Islands of Gabon